Macrophthalmothrips is a genus of thrips in the family Phlaeothripidae.

Species
 Macrophthalmothrips allops
 Macrophthalmothrips argus
 Macrophthalmothrips diasi
 Macrophthalmothrips femoralis
 Macrophthalmothrips flavafemora
 Macrophthalmothrips gracilis
 Macrophthalmothrips heinzei
 Macrophthalmothrips helenae
 Macrophthalmothrips hemipteroides
 Macrophthalmothrips kiesteri
 Macrophthalmothrips neocaledonensis
 Macrophthalmothrips pacholatkoi
 Macrophthalmothrips quadricolor
 Macrophthalmothrips splendidus
 Macrophthalmothrips usingeri
 Macrophthalmothrips williamsi

References

Phlaeothripidae
Thrips
Thrips genera